Mullanur Mullacan ulı Waxitov  Mullanur Waxitov (Tatar Cyrillic and), also spelled Vakhitov (10 August 1885 – 1918) was a Tatar revolutionary active in the Russian Revolution.

Early life 

Born in Kazan, he entered secondary school run by Social Democrats there in 1899. He participated in the 1905 revolutionary events and in 1906 he joined a Marxist study circle. In 1907, he entered economical department of St Petersburg Polytechnic Institute and moved to the law department of St Petersburg Psychoneurological Institute in 1912. There, he met Vladimir Bekhterev, Mikhail Frunze, Yakov Gamarnik, Larisa Reisner. At this time, he organised a study circle for Muslim students. By April 1917 he was back in Kazan where got involved in the Muslim Socialist Committee (MSK), which was influenced by the Communist Party in Kazan. He was the editor of a journal entitled Qızıl Bayraq.

After October Revolution 
In October 1917 Waxitov became a member of Kazan VRK. In January 1918, he was appointed commissar of Central Muslim Commissariat of Narkomnats (People's Commissariat on Nationalities) and a chairman of Central Military collegium attached to People's Commissariat of Military and Navy affairs.

Death 
In August 1918, he fought in the defence of Kazan from an attack by Czechoslovak Legion forces, but he was captured and hanged.

Waxitov was never a member of the Communist Party, as the Bolsheviks were known after their 7th Congress.

References

External links
 Vakhitov Mullanur

1885 births
1918 deaths
Russian Marxists
Tatar revolutionaries
Politicians from Kazan
Jadids
Russian Constituent Assembly members
Muslim socialists
tt:Mullanur Waxitov